Wycinki may refer to the following places:
Wycinki, Greater Poland Voivodeship (west-central Poland)
Wycinki, Kuyavian-Pomeranian Voivodeship (north-central Poland)
Wycinki, Masovian Voivodeship (east-central Poland)
Wycinki, Pomeranian Voivodeship (north Poland)